The quotation "all men are created equal" is part of the sentence in the U.S. Declaration of Independence – penned by Thomas Jefferson in 1776 during the beginning of the American Revolution – that reads "We hold these truths to be self-evident, that all men are created equal, that they are endowed by their Creator with certain unalienable Rights, that among these are Life, Liberty and the pursuit of Happiness."

The phrase echoes the words of John Locke in his second treatise on government, and other authors as early as the 14th century. Jefferson applied the concept in his original draft of the declaration. It was thereafter quoted and incorporated into speeches by a wide array of substantial figures in American political and social life in the United States. The final form of the phrase was stylized by Benjamin Franklin. It has been called an "immortal declaration", and "perhaps [the] single phrase" of the American Revolutionary period with the greatest "continuing importance."

Origins
Thomas Jefferson, through his friendship with Marquis de Lafayette, was heavily influenced by French philosophers of the Age of Enlightenment, such as Voltaire, Rousseau and Montesquieu. In their often censored writings, those philosophers advocated that men were born free and equal. This later led to the French Revolution of 1789 and the concept of Human Rights (Droits de l'Homme in French).  At the age of 33, Jefferson may have also borrowed the expression from an Italian friend and neighbor, Philip Mazzei, born in Prato, as noted by Joint Resolution 175 of the 103rd Congress as well as by John F. Kennedy in A Nation of Immigrants.

In English history there exists earlier uses of nearly the same phrase. First by the medieval priest John Ball who at the outbreak of the 1381 Peasants Revolt in his famous sermon posited the question "When Adam delved and Eve span, Who was then the gentleman?" and proclaimed "From the beginning all men by nature were created alike". In his 1690 work Second Treatise of Government the philosopher John Locke argues that in the "state of nature" that existed before the formation of governments all men were created equal. Another example is in John Milton's 1649 book called The Tenure of Kings and Magistrates, written after the First English Civil War to defend the actions and rights of the Parliamentary cause, in the wake of the execution of king Charles I. The English poet says: "No man who knows ought, can be so stupid to deny that all men naturally were borne free, being the image and resemblance of God himself ... born to command and not to obey: and that they liv'd so".

In 1776, the Second Continental Congress asked Benjamin Franklin, Thomas Jefferson, John Adams, Robert Livingston, and Roger Sherman to write the Declaration of Independence.  This Committee of Five voted to have Thomas Jefferson write the document.  After Jefferson finished he gave the document to Franklin to proof. Franklin suggested minor changes, one of which stands out far more than the others:  "We hold these truths to be sacred and un-deniable..." became "We hold these truths to be self-evident."

The second paragraph of the United States Declaration of Independence starts: "We hold these truths to be self-evident, that all men are created equal, that they are endowed by their Creator with certain unalienable Rights, that among these are Life, Liberty and the Pursuit of Happiness.-- That to secure these rights, Governments are instituted among Men, deriving their just powers from the consent of the governed."

George Mason was an elder-planter who had originally stated John Locke's theory of natural rights: "All men are born equally free and independent and have certain inherent natural rights of which they cannot, by any compact, deprive or divest their posterity; among which are the enjoyment of life and liberty, with the means of acquiring and possessing property, and pursuing and obtaining happiness and safety." Mason's draft was accepted by a small committee and then rejected by the Virginia Convention. Thomas Jefferson, a competent Virginia lawyer, saw this as a problem in legal writing and chose words that were more acceptable to the Second Continental Congress.

The Massachusetts Constitution, chiefly authored by John Adams in 1780, contains in its  Declaration of Rights the wording: "All men are born free and equal, and have certain natural, essential, and unalienable rights; among which may be reckoned the right of enjoying and defending their lives and liberties; that of acquiring, possessing, and protecting property; in fine, that of seeking and obtaining their safety and happiness."
 
The plaintiffs in the cases of Brom and Bett v. John Ashley and Commonwealth v. Nathaniel Jennison argued that this provision abolished slavery in Massachusetts.  The latter case resulted in a "sweeping declaration . . . that the institution of slavery was incompatible with the principles of liberty and legal equality articulated in the new Massachusetts Constitution".

The phrase has since been considered a hallmark statement in democratic constitutions and similar human rights instruments, many of which have adopted the phrase or variants thereof.

Slavery
The contradiction between the claim that "all men are created equal" and the existence of American slavery, including Thomas Jefferson himself owning slaves, attracted comment when the Declaration of Independence was first published. Before final approval, Congress, having made a few alterations to some of the wording, also deleted nearly a fourth of the draft, including a passage criticizing the slave trade.  At that time many other members of Congress also owned slaves, which clearly factored into their decision to delete the controversial "anti-slavery" passage. Jefferson believed adding such a passage would dissolve the independence movement. Jefferson argued many cases to free enslaved people. In Howell v. Netherland (April 1770), the most famous of these, Jefferson argued for the freedom of Samuel Howell, a mixed-race indentured servant, but was unsuccessful.   In writing the declaration, Jefferson believed the phrase "all men are created equal" to be self-evident, and would ultimately resolve slavery. In 1776, abolitionist Thomas Day wrote: "If there be an object truly ridiculous in nature, it is an American patriot, signing resolutions of independency with the one hand, and with the other brandishing a whip over his affrighted slaves." This phrase is further used in Martin Luther King Jr.'s "I Have a Dream" speech for many of these same reasons.

Criticism
The phrase "all men are created equal" has received criticism from elitists and traditional conservatives. Richard M. Weaver writing in one of the cornerstone works of traditional conservatism, Ideas Have Consequences (1948), paraphrased a 19th-century writer in writing that "no man was ever created free and no two men [were] ever created equal". He continues: "The comity of peoples in groups large or small rests not upon this chimerical notion of equality but upon fraternity, a concept which long antedates it in history because it goes immeasurably deeper in human sentiment. The ancient feeling of brotherhood carries obligations of which equality knows nothing. It calls for respect and protection, for brotherhood is status in family, and family is by nature hierarchical."

Howard Zinn and others have written that the phrase is sexist. Zinn says that the use of the word men, to the exclusion of women, indicated the women were "beyond consideration as worthy of inclusion" and "they were simply overlooked in any consideration of political rights, any notions of civic equality". However, others argue that, in the 1700s, the word men was sometimes used to denote both genders. According to the Library of Congress, most people have interpreted "all men" to mean humanity and, within the context of the times, it is clear that "all men" was a euphemism for "humanity".

It has also been criticised on grounds of racism. Nikole Hannah-Jones writes in The New York Times that "the white men who drafted those words did not believe them to be true for the hundreds of thousands of black people in their midst.".

Legacy
The Proclamation of Independence of the Democratic Republic of Vietnam, written in 1945, uses the phrase "all men are created equal" and also mentions the U.S. Declaration of Independence in it.

The Rhodesia's Unilateral Declaration of Independence, ratified in November 1965, is based on the American one, however, it omits the phrase "all men are created equal", along with "the consent of the governed".

See also
 French Declaration of the Rights of Man and of the Citizen (1789), article 1: "Men are born and remain free and equal in rights. Social distinctions may be founded only upon the general good."
 Second-class citizen
 Universal Declaration of Human Rights (1948), article 1: "All human beings are born free and equal in dignity and rights..."
 Equality before the law

References

Further reading

External links
 Letter Addressed to the Commonalty of Scotland by John Knox, 1558 – an early historical occurrence of the phrase "all men are equal" 

Concepts in ethics
Egalitarianism
Human rights concepts
American political catchphrases
English phrases
United States Declaration of Independence
Ethical principles
Humanism
Political quotes
1770s neologisms